The Ozark Open was a golf tournament on the PGA Tour from 1947 to 1951. It was played at Hickory Hills Country Club in Springfield, Missouri. It was a 54-hole event with prize money of $5,000. Harry Todd won the first two editions.

Winners

References

Former PGA Tour events
Golf in Missouri